Economics of corruption deals with the misuse of public power for private benefit and its economic impact on society. Economies that are afflicted by a high level of corruption are not capable of prospering as fully as those with a low level of corruption. Also, economies that are corrupted are not able to function properly since the natural laws of the economy can not function freely. As a consequence, corruption, for instance, leads to an inefficient allocation of resources, poor education, and healthcare or the presence of a shadow economy, a kind of economy that includes illegal activities as well as unreported income from the production of legal goods and services for which taxes should be paid, but are not.

Corruption can be measured objectively by counting the number of criminal indictments for corruption; however, this can be ineffective due to the fact that the ratio of indictments to actual corruption may be highly variable. Often corruption goes unpunished and is thus not counted in this measure. Subjective measures, typically curated via survey data, may be a useful tool to measure corruption. Comparisons between countries may be more comprehensive and consistent, though a fair amount of bias is present in this data as well due to the nature of the subject it measures. The International Country Risk Guide is a survey of firms on the likelihood they will be asked to make illegal or extralegal payments. The Corruption Perceptions Index is a detailed survey incorporating data from many nations and groups. Finally, the World Bank produces an annual "control of corruption" index that uses similar sources to the International Country Risk Guide and Corruption Perception Index.

History of the discipline 

In 1968, Nobel laureate economist Gunnar Myrdal found corruption 'almost a taboo (among economists) as research topic'. Indeed, it has mostly been a matter of political science and sociology. However, the scenario changed since the 1970s. Since Rose-Ackerman's article "The Economics of Corruption", published in the Journal of Public Economics in 1975, more than 3,000 articles have been written with 'corruption' in the title, at least 500 of which directly focus on different aspects relating to corruption using an economic framework. Some books have also been published on the subject.

Most corrupt countries 
No country has been able to eliminate corruption, but studies show that the level of corruption in countries with emerging market economies, which means that the nation's economy is progressing toward becoming more advanced, usually through significant GDP growth and industrialization, is much higher than it is in developed countries.

It has been proven that countries with relatively low levels of GDP per capita tend to have higher corruption levels. In addition, countries that developed early tend to have lower corruption scores. This may be due to the strong relationship between political institutions and corruption: those with more democratic and inclusive institutions tend to be less corrupt. For example, countries that have parliamentary democracies seem to have higher levels of corruption than democratically elected presidents. Note that this effect may be skewed by historical evidence from Latin America. Closed-list and proportional election systems may also breed more corruption than open-list electoral rules. High levels of legal formalism and regulation, as well as large natural resource endowments, are also correlated with higher levels of corruption.

The top 10 most corrupted countries

Corruption and income inequality 

The impact of corruption on income inequality was investigated Gupta et al. (2002). They find a significant positive impact of corruption on inequality while taking into account exogenous variables. Corruption has also an impact on income inequality through numerous channels, for instance, economic growth, biased tax system, asset ownership, etc.

Firstly, corruption can significantly affect the targeting of social problems. When the economy is corrupted, and government-funded programs are used to extend benefits to wealthy population groups or when poverty reduction funds are not used as they should because of corruption, the impact of social programs on income distribution could significantly diminish. Also, the higher corruption, the lower tax revenue, which results in lower resources for funding services such as education, etc.

Secondly, corruption can affect income inequality also through a biased tax system. Corruption can lead to poor tax administration or exemptions that could favor the wealthy ones with connections. As a result, the progressivity of the tax system could reduce; thus income inequality is possible.

Furthermore, when most of the asset is owned by elite groups of the population, they can take advantage of their wealth and lobby the government for favorable trade policies, which potentially could result in income inequality.

Corruption and its effect on price 

If the economy is corrupted, there may be some business owners who can use their connections and money to bribe government officials, as a result, not only policies but also market mechanisms are manipulated, and such companies could become a sole provider of goods or services, in other words, those companies could become a monopolistic or oligopolistic company. Monopolistic companies do not have to compete against others; thus they tend to set prices high and do not have an incentive for innovation and improving the quality of goods or services.

Corruption and disincentive for innovation 

There may be a disincentive for innovation also because the legal system of corrupted economies is not trustworthy enough. Potential inventors cannot be sure that their invention will be protected by patents and not copied by those who could bribe the authorities. That could be the reason why emerging countries usually import technology instead of innovating within their societies.

Corruption and growth of GDP  
Corruption breeds inefficiencies that may affect the static level of output. In order for corruption to affect economic growth as a whole, it must affect population growth, capital accumulation, or total factor productivity. A 1995 study by Paulo Mauro shows that capital accumulation, in the form of investment, is negatively correlated with corruption, particularly foreign direct investment. Due to the fact that technological advances are primarily driven by investment, this correlation also reveals that corruption can negatively affect total factor productivity.

According to Pak Hung Mo, political instability is the most important channel through which corruption affects economic growth. This study shows that a 1% increase in the corruption level means that the growth rate is reduced by about 0.72%. In other words, a one-unit increase in the corruption index reduces the growth rate by 0.545 percentage points.

Furthermore, income inequality harms the economy, on the contrary, according to new OECD analysis, reducing income inequality would boost economic growth. For instance, Mexico's rising inequality knocked off more than 10 percentage points off growth over the past two decades up to the Great Recession. Besides, there are countries like Spain, France, and Ireland, where greater equality helped increase GDP per capita before the crisis.

The OECD study also finds evidence, that the main mechanism through which inequality affects growth is by undermining education opportunities for children from families with poor socioeconomic status, which measures a person's work experience and also a person's or family's economic and social position to others, which lowers social mobility.

Corruption and education and healthcare 

Corruption harms the quality of education and public healthcare in emerging economies, according to the International Monetary Fund. That is because the cost of education in corrupted countries increases, especially when bribes influence the recruitment and promotion of teachers; consequently, the quality of education decreases. Not only quality of education decreases, but also corruption in healthcare has a huge impact. Many things can be affected by corruption, for instance, the designation of healthcare providers, recruitment of personnel, or procurement of medical supplies and equipment. As a result, it leads to inadequate healthcare treatment and restricted medical supply, which results in lower quality of overall healthcare.

Corruption and shadow economy 

Many studies were carried on the relationship between corruption and the shadow economy, which is still not very clear. The majority of them found that corruption is associated with tax evasion, because of bribery of officials by entrepreneurs. In this case, corruption increases the shadow economy and lowers economic growth. For instance, studies that were carried by Johnson et al. (1997), Fjeldstad (1996, 2003), Buehn and Schneider (2009), and Kaufman (2010) revealed such empirical findings that showed a positive relationship between corruption and shadow economy.

However, in high-income countries, public goods are more efficient and only small businesses tend to pay bribes and avoid taxation. Consequently, the income generated by such businesses exists outside the official economy; therefore the income is not included in the calculation of the country's GDP. Also, such business not only that pay their employees lower than the minimum wage, that is designed by the government in the country, but also they do not provide for instance health insurance benefits and other employee benefits.

On the contrary, the big companies tend to bribe officials to get a contract from the public sector, which means, that the contract is conducted in the official sector. In consequence, the relationship between corruption and shadow economy has been found negative in high-income countries.

Corruption and low foreign investment 

Investors often seek a fair competitive, business environment; thus they will mostly avoid investing in countries where there is a high level of corruption. Studies show a positive relationship between the level of corruption in a country and measurements of the competitiveness of its business environment.

Combatting corruption on the micro level 

According to Robert Klitgaard's equation, corruption = monopoly + discretion - accountability. Therefore, corruption is able to emerge and grow when there is a private or public monopoly over a good or service, and this individual or group has the discretionary power to allocate the good or service with few checks and balances and few, if any, consequences. By targeting individual components of the equation, there are several ways to fight corruption. First of all, reducing monopoly necessitates encouraging competition. This may be accomplished by publishing public procurement data online or making government contracts available to a wider range of potential firms. Successful examples of this include the case of countries such as Mexico, which made all government contracts and procurement plans available online so the general public could view plans, prices, and bid winners. Secondly, limiting discretion means making laws and government procedures accessible for a broad cross-section of society to view. This may be accomplished by the publication of documents detailing legal requirements for acquiring permits etc. in common languages and in an accessible format. Finally, increasing accountability may be accomplished by inviting impartial third parties to conduct government audits, as well as continually monitor and evaluate government procedures. This has been a success in countries such as Singapore and Hong Kong.

Books on economics of corruption
Some books have been produced with the specific title of "economics of corruption". One of these is The Economics of Corruption edited by Ajit Mishra published by the Oxford University Press in 2005. This book is an anthology of 11 essays under 4 categories, written by 16 economists. The titles of the essays give an idea of the various approaches taken by different economists. They are quoted below :
 Corruption : an Overview
 Corruption : Its causes and Effects
 Hierarchies and Bureaucracies: On the role of Collusion in Organizations
 A Theory of Misgovernance
 Pervasive Shortages under Socialism
 Corruption and Growth
 Corruptible Law Enforcers : How should they be compensated?
 Notes on bribery and control of corruption
 The Choice between Market failures and corruption
 Rents, Competition and corruption
 Electoral competition and Special Interest Politics

One can observe that these essays do not capture corruption in all its economic essence. Hundreds of essays have been published during the last two decades that deal with many more aspects of corruption from an economic perspective. Some other books are :
 Rose-Ackerman, S. : Corruption - A study in Political Economy, 1978, Academic Press, New York.
 Ekpo, M. U. (ed.) : Bureaucratic corruption in sub-Saharan Africa, 1979, University Press of America, Washington.
 Noonan, J. T. Bribes, 1984, Macmillan, New York.
 Chowdhury, F. L. Corrupt Bureaucracy and Privatization of Tax Enforcement, 2006, Pathak Samabesh, Dhaka.
 Fisman, R. and Golden, M. : Corruption: What Everyone Needs to Know, 2017, Oxford University Press, New York.

Courses on economics of corruption
Some universities and institutions including the University of Regina in Canada, Florida State University in the United States, and the University of Passau in Germany have started to offer courses on the economics of corruption. Additionally, the University of Rochester offers a course related to the history of economic corruption. One of the course outlines is given below. The course is offered by New Economic School, an institution in Russia. The course includes 14 lectures, the themes of which are as follows.

1. Corruption as an economic, social and political problem. Corruption's specific features in economies in transition.
2. Corruption and rent-seeking behavior. Basic model of rent-seeking and its research. Problem of rent's dissipation.
3. Static and dynamic models of Rent-seeking. Cases of pure and mixed public goods.
4. Rent-seeking behavior and free-riding. Rent-seeking in teams.
5. Rent-seeking in hierarchical systems.
6. "Artificial" rents and seeking for them.
7. Examples when rent-seeking arises in economies. Criminal rent-seeking.
8. Basil model of corruption and its analysis. Corruption models' classification.
9. Game-theoretical approaches towards corruption.
10. Corruption in hierarchical structures.
11. Dynamic corruption models.
12. Economic systems with corruption efficiency.
13. Statistical and econometrical approaches towards the research of corruption.
14. Macroeconomics aspects of corruption. Problems in the estimation of corruption influence on economic development.

Approaches to economic analyses of corruption
A systematic pattern in research on corruption from an economic perspective is yet to emerge. However, Ananish Chaudhuri has classified the foci of economic analyses of corruption into fourteen broad categories. These are:

 Economic causes of corruption
 Rent-seeking in the public offices, including Judiciary
 Corruption as an economic behavior, e.g. game-theoretic explanation
 Demand for and Supply of corruption, the optimal level of corruption, the optimal level of bribery, the efficiency of the market in corruption
 Impact of corruption on the competitiveness in the market for goods and services
 Measurement of the level of corruption, comparative county-studies
 Corruption in different economic activities, e.g. public procurement, defense procurement
 Sources of corruption: Revenue collection, Foreign aid, Foreign Direct Investment
 Corruption in the private sector, Economies in transition
 Impact of corruption on economic growth, national development and the level of poverty
 Welfare impact of corruption, Income redistribution resulting from corruption
 Factors affecting corruption, e.g. Shadow economy, Smuggling, weak state, corruption by politicians
 Relation between corruption on the one hand and other economic-social-cultural aspects like technological progress, environment and ecology,
 Economic factors relating to anti-corruption programs, e.g. optimal level of punishment for corruption etc.

See also 
 ISO 37001 Anti-bribery management systems
 Group of States Against Corruption
 International Anti-Corruption Academy
 United Nations Convention against Corruption
 OECD Anti-Bribery Convention

References

Corruption
Public economics